Ōtaki Beach is a small settlement in the Kapiti Coast District of the Wellington Region of New Zealand's North Island.  It is located on the South Taranaki Bight north of the mouth of Ōtaki River, 4.0 kilometres northwest of Ōtaki.

A cairn opposite 224 Marine Parade commemorates the shipwrecks of Felixstowe, a barque, and City of Auckland, a full-rigged ship carrying immigrants, in October 1878. Shipwrecks were common on Ōtaki beach in the 19th century.

The area was divided into residential sections and roads built in the early 1920s.

Demographics

Ōtaki Beach had a population of 1,818 at the 2018 New Zealand census, an increase of 198 people (12.2%) since the 2013 census, and an increase of 129 people (7.6%) since the 2006 census. There were 765 households. There were 852 males and 966 females, giving a sex ratio of 0.88 males per female. The median age was 47.7 years (compared with 37.4 years nationally), with 309 people (17.0%) aged under 15 years, 258 (14.2%) aged 15 to 29, 789 (43.4%) aged 30 to 64, and 462 (25.4%) aged 65 or older.

Ethnicities were 74.8% European/Pākehā, 37.0% Māori, 3.5% Pacific peoples, 2.1% Asian, and 1.3% other ethnicities (totals add to more than 100% since people could identify with multiple ethnicities).

The proportion of people born overseas was 14.4%, compared with 27.1% nationally.

Although some people objected to giving their religion, 50.8% had no religion, 35.3% were Christian, 0.7% were Hindu, 0.2% were Muslim, 0.5% were Buddhist and 4.5% had other religions.

Of those at least 15 years old, 309 (20.5%) people had a bachelor or higher degree, and 273 (18.1%) people had no formal qualifications. The median income was $25,600, compared with $31,800 nationally. The employment status of those at least 15 was that 603 (40.0%) people were employed full-time, 210 (13.9%) were part-time, and 84 (5.6%) were unemployed.

References

Populated places in the Wellington Region
Kapiti Coast District
Beaches of the Wellington Region